Joe Thum was a champion bowler that owned different bowling alleys in New York City starting in 1881 and going through the nineteenth century. He bowled to 1911.

References

Sources 

American restaurateurs
Year of death missing
Year of birth missing